Austin Brady (born 17 April 1955 in Dublin) was an Irish association football (soccer) player from the 1970s to the 1990s.

Brady played as a defender for Bohemians, amongst others, during his career in the League of Ireland. He made 7 appearances for Bohemians in European competition. He also won amateur international caps for Ireland.

In May 1987, Brady had his testimonial at Richmond Park.

Honours
League of Ireland Cup:
 Bohemians 1979
League of Ireland First Division: 
Athlone Town- 1987/88
'''Leinster Senior Cup (football): 4
 Bohemians - 1978/79, 1979/80
 St Patrick's Athletic 1986/87
 Athlone Town 1987/88

References

Republic of Ireland association footballers
Association football defenders
League of Ireland players
League of Ireland XI players
Bohemian F.C. players
St Patrick's Athletic F.C. players
Athlone Town A.F.C. players
Drogheda United F.C. players
Monaghan United F.C. players
1955 births
Living people